John Smith was an Ontario tanner and political figure. He represented Kent in the 1st Legislative Assembly of Ontario as a Liberal member.

He was born in England. Smith also served as mayor of Chatham.

External links 
The Canadian parliamentary companion HJ Morgan (1869)
Member's parliamentary history for the Legislative Assembly of Ontario

Ontario Liberal Party MPPs
Mayors of places in Ontario
Year of birth missing
Year of death missing